The 2009–10 Football League Trophy, known as the 2009–10 Johnstone's Paint Trophy for sponsorship reasons, is the 26th Football League Trophy, a knockout competition for English football clubs in Leagues One and Two, the third and fourth tiers of English football.

The format is similar to that which has been used since 1996, with four first round regions; North-West, North-East, South-West and South-East; which were used for the first time in the second region, before a two-region format from the area quarter-finals (3rd round); North and South. The resulting regional winners then meet in the final.

Luton Town were the defending champions, but were not allowed to defend the trophy due to relegation to the Conference in the same season.

First round

Sixteen teams were granted byes to the Second Round, which were drawn on 3 August, while the remaining teams were drawn for the First Round ties on Soccer AM on 15 August 2009. As part of new rules enforced this season, teams who received byes the previous season were not allowed to receive byes this season. The First Round matches were played in the week commencing 31 August 2009.

Northern Section

Southern Section

First round byes

Northern section

Grimsby Town, Hartlepool United, Leeds United, Macclesfield Town, Notts County, Port Vale, Shrewsbury Town, Tranmere Rovers.

Southern section

Aldershot Town, Brighton & Hove Albion, Charlton Athletic, Exeter City, Leyton Orient, Southampton, Southend United, Swindon Town.

Second round

The Second Round draw took place on 5 September 2009, with matches to be played in the week commencing 5 October 2009.

Northern Section

Southern Section

Area-quarter-finals

The draw for the area quarter-finals took place on 10 October 2009. The matches were played in the week commencing 9 November 2009.

Northern Section

Southern Section

Area semi-finals

The draw for the area semi-finals took place on 14 November 2009. The matches were played in the week commencing 14 December 2009.

Northern Section

Southern Section

Area finals
The area finals, which serve as the semi-finals for the entire competition, were contested over two legs, home and away.

Northern Section

Carlisle United 4–4 Leeds United on aggregate.  Carlisle United won 6–5 on penalties.

Southern Section

Southampton won 4–1 on aggregate

Final

Top scorers
Football League Trophy

References

External links
 Tournament home page

EFL Trophy
Trophy
Trophy